The year 2007 is the 1st year in the history of the Elite Xtreme Combat, a mixed martial arts promotion based in The United States. In 2007 Elite Xtreme Combat held 8 events beginning with, EliteXC Destiny.

Title fights

Events list

EliteXC Destiny

EliteXC Destiny was an event held on February 10, 2007 at DeSoto Civic Center in Southaven, Mississippi.

Results

Dynamite!! USA

Dynamite!! USA was an event held on June 2, 2007 at Los Angeles Memorial Coliseum in Los Angeles.

Results

Strikeforce Shamrock vs. Baroni

Strikeforce Shamrock vs. Baroni was an event held on June 22, 2007 at The HP Pavilion in San Jose, California.

Results

ShoXC: Elite Challenger Series

ShoXC: Elite Challenger Series was an event held on July 27, 2007 at Chumash Casino Resort in Santa Ynez, California.

Results

ShoXC: Elite Challenger Series

ShoXC: Elite Challenger Series was an event held on August 25, 2007 at Vicksburg Convention Center in Vicksburg, Mississippi.

Results

EliteXC: Uprising

EliteXC: Uprising was an event held on September 15, 2007 at Neal S. Blaisdell Arena in Oahu, Hawaii.

Results

ShoXC: Elite Challenger Series

ShoXC: Elite Challenger Series was an event held on October 26, 2007 at Chumash Casino Resort in Santa Ynez, California.

Results

EliteXC: Renegade

EliteXC: Renegade was an event held on November 10, 2007 at The American Bank Center in Corpus Christi, Texas.

Results

See also 
 Elite Xtreme Combat

References

Elite Xtreme Combat events
2007 in mixed martial arts